, abbreviated , is a Japanese light novel series written by Yume Mizusawa and illustrated by Ayumu Kasuga. Shogakukan has published all twenty-two volumes under their Gagaga Bunko imprint since June 2012. An anime adaptation produced by Production IMS aired in Japan from October 9, 2014 to December 25, 2014.

Plot
Soji Mitsuka is an ordinary high school boy who has an obsession for twintail hair. One day he encounters a mysterious girl named Twoearle, who is from a parallel world, when monsters appear in his town and declare that all twintails in the world belong to them. These monsters feed off "attribute strength", the spiritual energy of humans. Twoearle entrusted Soji with Tail Gear, imaginary armor initiated by powerful twintail attributes. With the armor, Soji transforms into a girl and  branded Tail Red, to protect Earth.

Characters

Twintail Warriors
 
Soji (male) 
Souji (female)/Tail Red 
The main protagonist, a gentle-natured 15-year-old freshman of Yōgetsu Private Academy, who is obsessed with the twintail hairstyle. One day, he encounters a mysterious beautiful girl named Twoerle, who appears before him from a parallel world. At the same time, monsters begin to appear in his town, and they start attacking the citizens. In the midst of the chaos, Twoerle entrusted him with attribute power, thus suddenly transforming him into a twin tail warrior girl, known as Tail Red. Due to his alter ego (Tail Red) becoming popular quickly after his debut and him being the first twintail warrior to transform, he is the leader of the Twintails. In Vol 4, he gained two power-up forms: Riser Chain and Faller Chain. He later gains Ultimate Chain (his strongest form) after regaining his Twintail Elémera which he lost to Tyranno Guildy previously.

 

One of the heroines, a 15-year-old freshman of Yōgetsu Private Academy and childhood best friend of Soji. She treats Soji like a little brother and is rather overprotective of him although this is later discovered to be because of her massive crush on him. Aika has a complex with her body, especially with her flat chest. She has a violent attitude toward Twoerle who often teases her about her chest. When she first became a Twintail warrior, she was mostly hated by the public, until later when Tail Yellow joins the team. In battle, Aika has an outstanding ability of fighting as she was raised by her grandfather with martial arts. In Vol 8, she gains Eternal Chain.

 

One of the heroines, a 16-year-old sophomore of Yōgetsu Private Academy and the Student Council President. She is a closet masochist and exhibitionist, and gets aroused when Soji calls her name (which usually triggers her to call him master). When she first became a Twintail warrior she was a completely reckless fighter because of her maschostic ways. Also she was the only one of the twintails who at first couldn't use her power because of her denial of twintails until Soji gets her to accept them. Unlike Soji and Aika, Erina's twin-tail warrior form makes her whole body look a lot older and has a more well endowed figure. In Vol 7, she gains Absolute Chain.

 

Another heroine, a mysterious girl who comes from another planet and the first Tail Warrior. She enjoys teasing Aika with her large bust and often ends up grievously injured for it. She fell in love with Soji at first sight and openly tries to seduce him with his mother's approval. After Soji defeats the first wave of attacks from the monsters, she decides to transfer into Yōgetsu Private Academy as a student and calls herself Soji's relative. Before arriving on Earth, she was the original Tail Blue but gave up her twin-tail hair style to make the Tail Red gear after her world lost all its attributes. She felt immense regret and shame for not saving her world and retired from fighting as she felt she was no longer capable of defeating the Ultimegil and passed her mantle on to Soji, feeling he would do much better than she did. After seeing Soji's determination and willingness to protect the innocent, she was happy knowing she made the right choice on appointing her successor. She was able to regain her twin tail form and became Tail White but her form is limited to a few minutes. Though it compensates by being more powerful than Soji's Tail Red in its Ultimate Chain form.

   

A girl from a different world, yet from the same village as Twoerle. She is secretly a big fan of Twoerle and stalks her often. After Twoerle disappeared, she joined the Ultimegil organization in attempt to find Twoerle under the name Dark Grasper or Dark Glassper. Once she found Twoerle, she betrayed Evil Gill. In battle, she is known as Tail Black. Her weapon is Darkness Grave Moebius, and her weapon when she was in the Evil Gill was Sickle Grave of Darkness.
But when she works as a singer on earth, she use the name .

Others

Soji's 36-year-old mother. A widow who runs her own café named . She is aware of her son's identity as Tail Red and openly supports him as she herself once dreamed of being in his position. She also does not mind Twoerle's attempts at seducing Soji and even asks her to 'make her son a man'.

Erina's 28-year-old maid. She has an outstanding physical ability despite her work as a maid. At times, she works part time as a PE teacher for Yōgetsu Private Academy. She usually slips marriage registration forms in the boys' test slips with her name on them, or she will try to trick Soji to sign his name on it; which is a clear example that she is desperate to get married before reaching 30.

A robot who is Anko's trusted helper and confidant. Because her full name is long, Anko calls her Megane (Japanese for glasses) for short which she dislikes.

An imaginary being, created by Soji's subconsciousness that helps him to renew his twin-tail love.

Erina's mother and the school's principal. She tries to fix arranged marriage meetings for Erina which the latter dislikes. When Soji stands up for Erina, Emu takes a liking to him and accepts him as Erina's future husband, to the shock of the other girls.

Ultimegil
 is an organization of phantom-monsters called Eremerian that traverse different worlds, seeking a variety of "attributes". Although they are the villains of the story, the majority of them are rather silly and comical and behave much like otakus, often admiring cute girls, collecting dolls, and even adoring the twintail heroines. Having discovered Earth is rich in "attributes", they began to colonize and make plans to conquer the Earth. Members include:

 The leader of the Ultimegil. He has a twintail fetish.

 An Eremerian soldier that has a doll-holding girl fetish.

Turtlegildy

 An Eremerian soldier that has a bloomer fetish.

Foxgildy

 An Eremerian soldier that has a ribbon fetish.

Swangildy

Tigergildy

An Eremerian soldier that has a swimsuit fetish.

Sparrowgildy

Krakegildy

An Eremerian soldier that has a flat chest fetish.

Leviagildy

An Eremerian soldier that has a big breast fetish.

Buffalogildy

An Eremerian soldier that has a giant breast fetish.

Crabgildy

An Eremerian soldier that has a backneck fetish.

An Eremerian soldier that has a lip fetish.

Alligatorguildy

Hedgehogguildy

Kerberosguildy

An Eremerian soldier that has a braid fetish.

An Eremerian soldier that has a literature fetish.

Spidergildy

 An Eremerian soldier that has a male crossdressing fetish.

Fleagildy

 An Eremerian soldier that has a leg fetish.

Wormgildy

 An Eremerian soldier that has a crossdressing fetish.

Snailgildy

Media

Light novels
Ore, Twintail ni Narimasu. began as a light novel series written by Yume Mizusawa, with illustrations by Ayumu Kasuga. Mizusawa originally entered the first novel in the series, originally titled , into Shogakukan's sixth Shogakukan Light Novel Prize in 2011 and the novel won the judge's prize. The first novel was published by Shogakukan on June 19, 2012 under their Gagaga Bunko imprint, and fourteen novels have been released as of December 19, 2017.

The series was originally slated to conclude in October 2018, with the release of its 16th volume. However, a 17th volume was released on March 19, 2019. The series ended with the 21st volume (22nd overall) on November 18, 2022.

Manga
A manga adaptation titled  by Ryōta Suzuki was serialized in Square Enix's Monthly Big Gangan magazine, and was compiled into two tankōbon volumes.

Anime
An anime television series adaptation, produced by Production IMS and directed by Hiroyuki Kanbe, aired in Japan from October 9, 2014 to December 25, 2014. The ending theme is  sung by the voice actresses of the three main heroines: Tail Red (Sumire Uesaka), Tail Blue (Yūka Aisaka), and Tail Yellow (Chinatsu Akasaki). Both singles for the opening and ending themes were released on October 22, 2014. The anime has been licensed for streaming in North America by Funimation and in the Middle East, North Africa, Europe (excluding UK and Scandinavia) by Crunchyroll and AnimeLab in Australia and New Zealand.

Episode list

References

External links
 
 

2012 Japanese novels
Anime and manga based on light novels
Funimation
Gagaga Bunko
Gangan Comics manga
Light novels
Magical girl anime and manga
Production IMS
Seinen manga
Shogakukan franchises
Television shows based on light novels
TBS Television (Japan) original programming
Transforming heroes